Paul Alexander Desmond de Maine (October 11, 1924 – May 13, 1999) was a leading figure in the early development of computer-based automatic indexing and information retrieval and one of the founders of academic computer science in the 1960s.

Early life and education
He was born in South Africa and took his B.Sc in chemistry and mathematics from the University of Witwatersrand in 1948. De Maine emigrated to England in 1949. He later moved to Canada where he completed his Ph.D. in physical chemistry at the University of British Columbia. He finally moved to the United States in 1957 and served as professor at the University of Mississippi from 1960-63. In 1982 he settled in Auburn.

Career
During his career he worked in the United States for the National Bureau of Standards, the Ballistic Missile Defense Advanced Technology Center, and on the campuses of SUNY Albany, University of Mississippi, University of Illinois, UC Santa Barbara, The Pennsylvania State University and Auburn University. He also served on the publication committee of the magazine Computer while at Pennsylvania State University.

Publications 
He was the author of 1 patent, two books, and more than 200 published scientific research articles and reports in chemistry, computational chemistry and computer science. His fields of research included spectroscopy, charge transfer complexes, solution theory, data compression, information retrieval, human-machine interfaces, expert systems and systems for detecting and correcting computational errors.

Selected works

References

South African emigrants to the United States
University at Albany, SUNY faculty
University of Mississippi faculty
Auburn University faculty
University of Illinois faculty
University of California, Santa Barbara faculty
Pennsylvania State University faculty
1924 births
1999 deaths
American physical chemists
Place of birth missing
Computational chemists
University of British Columbia alumni
University of the Witwatersrand alumni
South African chemists
White South African people
South African expatriates in Canada